John Alanson Perkins (1914–1982) was an American academic, academic administrator and politician. He served as president of the University of Delaware from 1950 to 1967 (on leave from 1957 to 1958) and served as the United States Under Secretary of Health, Education, and Welfare from April 1957 to March 1958.

References

United States Deputy Secretaries of Health and Human Services
University of Delaware people
1914 births
1982 deaths